Marcel Băban (born 16 October 1968) is a Romanian former professional footballer who played as a striker for teams such as: Politehnica Timișoara, Rapid București, Corvinul Hunedoara, Darmstadt 98 or Bohemians Praha, among others.

After retirement, in 2010, Marcel Băban bought the club from his hometown, FC Jimbolia and transformed it in a football academy, named Marcel Băban Jimbolia. In March 2017 he bought third tier club, Nuova Mama Mia Becicherecu Mic, but due to lack of funding and some financial problems from the past, the club relegated twice (2017 and 2018) and even if it was spared from relegation in the summer of 2017, the next season was disastrous, finishing last with -14 points and dissolving.

Personal life
His son, Denis Băban, is also a footballer.

Honours

Player
 Politehnica Timișoara
 Cupa României: Runner-up 1991–92
 Divizia B: Winner 1994–95

References

External links
 
 

1970 births
Living people
People from Jimbolia
Romanian footballers
Association football goalkeepers
Liga I players
Liga II players
FC Politehnica Timișoara players
FC Rapid București players
CS Corvinul Hunedoara players
FC Olimpia Satu Mare players
FC UTA Arad players
Oberliga (football) players
SV Darmstadt 98 players
Czech First League players
Bohemians 1905 players
Croatian Football League players
NK Zadar players
Ekstraklasa players
Ruch Chorzów players
CS Unirea Sânnicolau Mare players
Romanian expatriate footballers
Romanian expatriate sportspeople in Germany
Expatriate footballers in Germany
Romanian expatriate sportspeople in the Czech Republic
Expatriate footballers in the Czech Republic
Romanian expatriate sportspeople in Croatia
Expatriate footballers in Croatia
Romanian expatriate sportspeople in Poland
Expatriate footballers in Poland
Romanian football managers